36 Combat Engineer Regiment (36CER) is a reserve unit of the Canadian Military Engineers in Halifax, Nova Scotia Canada. It is part of the 36 Canadian Brigade Group, 5th Canadian Division.

Organization 
There are currently two Field Squadrons providing general engineer support to the brigade, and a Regimental Headquarters in 36 CER:
 20 Engineer Squadron is located in Halifax, Nova Scotia and consists of a field troop and a training troop.
 45 Engineer Squadron is located in Sydney, Nova Scotia.
 RHQ is composed of the regimental command staff, Ops and training staff, and administration and logistics staff.

Order of precedence

See also 

 Military history of Canada
 History of the Canadian Army
 Canadian Forces
 List of armouries in Canada

References 

Engineer regiments of Canada
Military units and formations of Nova Scotia